Chamarajanagar Lok Sabha constituency is one of the 28 Lok Sabha constituencies in Karnataka state in southern India. This constituency is reserved for the Scheduled Castes. This constituency came into existence in 1962.

Assembly segments
Chamarajanagar Lok Sabha constituency comprises the following Legislative Assembly segments:

Members of Parliament

Election results

2019

General Election 1971

General Election 1980

2014

2009

General Election 1967

See also
 Chamarajanagar district
 List of Constituencies of the Lok Sabha

References

External links
Chamarajanagar lok sabha  constituency election 2019 date and schedule

Lok Sabha constituencies in Karnataka
Chamarajanagar district